Jakub Šulc (born December 16, 1985) is a Czech professional ice hockey defenceman currently playing for HC Slavia Praha. He played in HC České Budějovice, Czech Extraliga during the 2010–11 Czech Extraliga season.

References

External links

1985 births
Living people
BK Havlíčkův Brod players
BK Mladá Boleslav players
Czech ice hockey defencemen
Étoile Noire de Strasbourg players
HC Berounští Medvědi players
HC Slavia Praha players
HC Stadion Litoměřice players
Motor České Budějovice players
Piráti Chomutov players
Ice hockey people from Prague
Czech expatriate ice hockey people
Expatriate ice hockey players in France
Czech expatriate sportspeople in France